Tibouchina edmundoi is a species of flowering plant in the family Melastomataceae, native to north Brazil. It was first described by Alexander Curt Brade in 1959.

References

edmundoi
Flora of North Brazil
Plants described in 1959